The Kutsayoki is a river in the south of the Kola Peninsula in Murmansk Oblast, Russia. The Kutsayoki flows through the Lake Nivayarvi and flows into the Tumcha. Its biggest tributary is the Vuosnayoki.

References

Rivers of Murmansk Oblast